The 1950 Ladies Open Championships was held at the Lansdowne Club in London from 19–26 February 1950. Janet Morgan won her first title defeating Joan Curry in the final. Former multiple champion Margot Lumb returned to competition as Mrs Margot Gordon.

Seeds

Draw and results

First round

seed *

Second round

Third round

Quarter-finals

Semi-finals

Final

References

Women's British Open Squash Championships
Women's British Open Squash Championships
Women's British Open Squash Championships
Squash competitions in London
Women's British Open Championships
British Open Championships 
Women's British Open Squash Championships